Pirlu (also Romanized as Pīrlū; also known as Pīr ‘Alīlū) is a village in Angut-e Sharqi Rural District, Anguti District, Germi County, Ardabil Province, Iran. At the 2006 census, its population was 242, in 47 families.

References 

Tageo

Towns and villages in Germi County